Braver is a surname. Notable people with the surname include:

 Adam Braver (born 1963), American author
 Gary Braver, pen name of Gary Goshgarian, science fiction and thriller author
 Rita Braver (born 1948), correspondent for CBS News

See also
 Braver (Transformers)